The men's triple jump at the 1950 European Athletics Championships was held in Brussels, Belgium, at Heysel Stadium on 23 August 1950.

Medalists

Results

Final
23 August

Participation
According to an unofficial count, 16 athletes from 14 countries participated in the event.

 (1)
 (1)
 (1)
 (1)
 (1)
 (1)
 (1)
 (1)
 (1)
 (1)
 (2)
 (1)
 (1)
 (2)

References

Triple jump
Triple jump at the European Athletics Championships